Abraham Herr Smith (March 7, 1815 – February 16, 1894) was an American politician who served as a Republican member of the U.S. House of Representatives for Pennsylvania's 9th congressional district from 1873 to 1885.

Early life and education
Smith was born near Millersville, Pennsylvania to Jacob Smith and Elizabeth Herr. His parents died when he was eight years old and he was raised by his paternal grandparents. 

He attended Professor Beck's Academy at Lititz, Pennsylvania, studied at Harrington College, and then graduated from Dickinson College in Carlisle, Pennsylvania in 1840. After completing his law studies, he was admitted to the bar in 1842, and commenced practice in Lancaster, Pennsylvania.

Career
He served as a Whig member of the Pennsylvania State House of Representatives from 1843 to 1844 and in the Pennsylvania State Senate for the 7th district from 1845 to 1848.

Smith was elected as a Republican to the Forty-third and to the five succeeding Congresses. He served as chairman of the United States House Committee on Mileage during the Forty-seventh Congress, and served for six years on the War Claims Committee and the Appropriations Committee.

An unsuccessful candidate for renomination in 1884, he resumed the practice of law, and died in Lancaster in 1894. He was interred in the Woodward Hill Cemetery.

Legacy
The A. Herr Smith Memorial Hall in the Denny Hall building of the Union Philosophical Society at Dickinson College was named in his honor.

Notes

Sources

The Political Graveyard

External links

 

|-

|-

1815 births
1894 deaths
19th-century American politicians
Burials at Woodward Hill Cemetery
Dickinson College alumni
Republican Party members of the Pennsylvania House of Representatives
Pennsylvania lawyers
Politicians from Lancaster, Pennsylvania
Republican Party Pennsylvania state senators
Pennsylvania Whigs
People from Millersville, Pennsylvania
Republican Party members of the United States House of Representatives from Pennsylvania
19th-century American lawyers